Abeluzius is a saint of the Ethiopian Orthodox Tewahedo Church. He is commemorated with a feast day of January 15. Little else is known of the person. It has been speculated that the name may be a typographical error for "Abba Lucius", a Syro-Roman name.

References

Sources
Holweck, F. G. A Biographical Dictionary of the Saints. St. Louis, MO: B. Herder Book Co., 1924.

Christian saints in unknown century
Year of birth missing
Year of death missing
Ethiopian saints